Grče is a village in the Municipality of Žalec in east-central Slovenia. It lies on the southwest part of the Ponikva Plateau. The area is part of the traditional region of Styria. The municipality is now included in the Savinja Statistical Region.

History
Grče was a hamlet of Kale until 2003, when it became a separate settlement.

References

External links
Grče at Geopedia

Populated places in the Municipality of Žalec
Populated places established in 2003